This is a list of the Palestine national football team results from 2010 to 2019.

Palestinians continued to be unable to qualify for the World Cup finals as their qualifying campaign ended early. However, the closest chance to qualify was in 2018 when the Palestinian national team collected 14 points and was close to advancing to the crucial stage, but losing in the penultimate round ended their hopes. The Palestinian team failed to reach four tournaments in a row but managed to reach the last two Asian Cup finals, first in 2015. So far, the best Palestinian result in the tournament is still the group stage. In addition, the team has climbed to 73rd which is their best position in the FIFA World Rankings since the Palestinian Federation re-joined in 1998.

Results

2010

2011

2012

2013

2014

2015

2016

2017

2018

2019

Notes

References

External links
 Palestine fixtures on FIFA.com
 Palestine fixtures on eloratings.net
 RSSSF: Palestine – International Results

2010s in the State of Palestine
2010-19
2010s in the Palestinian territories